An orphan virus is a virus that is not associated with a disease but may possess pathogenicity.

Some orphan viruses include adeno-associated virus (Parvoviridae), human herpesvirus 7 (Herpesviridae), human foamy virus (Retroviridae), Human Reovirus (Reoviridae), hepatitis G (Flaviviridae), and TT virus (Anelloviridae).

Gilbert Dalldorf, a pathologist who showed that Coxsackie viruses paralyze mice but not humans, indicated that the term ‘orphan’ was created "in a moment of conviviality" by a group of virologists.

Many enteroviruses are referred to as ECHO, enteric cytopathic human orphan viruses, because they were originally not associated with any disease. Even though many of them are associated with severe diseases, the name ECHO still continues to be used.

See also
 Novel virus
 Reoviridae
 Viral metagenomics

References

Viruses
Zoonoses
Virology